You're Back in the Room is an Australian television game show based on the British TV show of the same name that began being aired on the Nine Network on 3 April 2016. It is hosted by Daryl Somers and hypnotist Keith Barry who is the hypnotist on the British version.

Format
The contestants have the opportunity to win cash prizes while being under the influence of hypnotism. Hypnotist Keith Barry puts each one under hypnosis to thwart their efforts. Over five rounds, the contestants take part in a series of outrageous games where tasks need to be completed in order to win. Their cash pot accumulates throughout the show before they attempt to win as much as possible in a fast-paced final round.

The contestants are all competing for $20,000, but may lose money if they do not succeed in a set number of challenges that need to be completed successfully in order to accumulate prize earnings.

Episodes

Episode One round

Episode Two rounds

Episode Three rounds

Episode Four rounds

Episode Five rounds

Ratings

References

Nine Network original programming
2010s Australian game shows
2016 Australian television series debuts
2016 Australian television series endings
English-language television shows
Television shows set in Sydney
Australian television series based on British television series